The Standard Schedules Information Manual (SSIM) published by the International Air Transport Association documents international airline standards and procedures for exchanging airline schedules and data on aircraft types, airports and terminals, and time zones.

References

 Official page at IATA

Travel technology